General elections were held in Malta between 13 and 18 June 1870.

Background
The elections were held under the 1849 constitution, which provided for an 18-member Government Council, of which ten members would be appointed and eight elected.

Results
A total of 2,732 people were registered to vote, of which 1,908 cast votes, giving a turnout of 70%.

References

General elections in Malta
Malta
1870 in Malta
June 1870 events